Nong Nian Railway Halt is a railway halt located in Bang Luek Subdistrict, Chumphon City, Chumphon.

Train services 
 Ordinary 254/255 Lang Suan-Thon Buri-Lang Suan

References 
 
 

Railway stations in Thailand